Aboh Mbaise is a Local Government Area of Imo State, Nigeria. Its headquarters is in the town of Aboh.

It has an area of 184 km and a population of 194,779 at the 2006 census. There are different towns in Aboh-Mbaise such as Nguru, Uvuru, Mbutu, okwuato, Lorji, Amuzu, Enyiogugu.

Aboh-Mbaise has rich cultural value. Nguru, in particular, celebrates its Itu aka Nguru Uboma ahia ise cultural festival every year in February. ITU AKA Nguru Uboma Ahia Ise holds at Nguru Centre mostly last Saturday of February each year. The ceremonies start with the Ike Aka and continue with the Egwu Onwa. ITU AKA Ngwuru Uboma Ahia Ise is a celebration that dates back in history.
Itu Aka literally means "pointing out" or showing. In the days when Nguru and his children settled in Nguru Land, farming was the main occupation of the people and was done by shifting cultivation, whereby the people will farm in one area in one year and move to another area another year.  The ceremony used to be a religious and traditional ceremony by which the elders and priests of Nguru will kick start the planting season by offering sacrifices and "pointing out" or “showing” to the people, which part of the forest they will farm that year. The ceremonies start with the Ike Aka Ceremony, followed by the Igwo Onwa which comes up one week later and finally the ITU AKA Ceremony which is the grand finale.

The postal code of the area is 462001.

History

References
Agulanna, E.C. (2008). The Mbaiseness of Mbaise, 2nd. ed. Owerri: Career Publishers.|Agulanna, E.C. (2008). The Mbaiseness of Mbaise, 2nd. ed. Owerri: Career Publishers.

https://web.archive.org/web/20190511194013/http://www.mbaisepioneerassociation.com/history.htm

Local Government Areas in Imo State
Towns in Imo State
Local Government Areas in Igboland